The Grange School is a private school in La Reina, Santiago, Chile. It was founded June 4, 1928, by John A. S. Jackson, an Anglo-Chilean born in Valparaíso and educated at Cambridge University. 

In 2006, the British newspaper The Guardian listed The Grange School as one of the best UK-curriculum international schools in the world.

The Grange School is a member of The Independent Association of Prep Schools, The Headmasters' and Headmistresses' Conference, The Latin American Heads Conference, and The Association of British Schools in Chile.

Extracurricular Activities
The Grange School offers a total of 4 sports, 2 for girls and 2 for boys. Volleyball and field hockey are available to girls while boys can play rugby and football (soccer). Track and field competitions at the end of the year are available to both genders. During weekends, friendly matches are held against other schools belonging to The Association of British Schools in Chile. Teachers and students are split into 4 different 'colors' for school competitions.

References

External links
Official site

Educational institutions established in 1928
International schools in Santiago, Chile
British international schools
1928 establishments in Chile
Private schools in Chile
Schools in Santiago Metropolitan Region